Walliser may refer to:
 people from the Swiss canton of Valais (German: Wallis)
 Pennine Alps (German: Walliser Alpen)
 Walliser German, an Alemannic dialect spoken in Valais and other regions of the Alps
 Cole Walliser (born 1981), a Canadian filmmaker and music video director
 Maria Walliser (born 1963), a Swiss former alpine skier
 Ursi Walliser (born 1975), a Swiss skeleton racer

Ethnonymic surnames